This is a list of robotic space probes that have flown by, impacted, orbited or landed on the Moon for the purpose of lunar exploration, as well as probes launched toward the Moon that failed to reach their target.  

The crewed Apollo missions are listed at List of missions to the Moon.

Major programs encompassing several probes include:
 Luna program — USSR Lunar exploration (1959–1976)
 Ranger program — US Lunar hard-landing probes (1961–1965)
 Zond program — USSR Lunar exploration (1964–1970)
 Surveyor program — US Lunar soft-landing probe (1966–1968)
 Lunar Orbiter program — US Lunar orbital (1966–1967)
 Lunokhod program — USSR Lunar Rover probes (1970–1973)

Key
Colour key:
{|
|-
| – Mission or flyby completed successfully (or partially successfully)
|   
| – Failed or cancelled mission
|-
| – Mission en route or in progress (including mission extensions)
|
| – Planned mission
|
|}

† means "tentatively identified", as classified by NASA . These are Cold War-era Soviet missions, mostly failures, about which few or no details have been officially released. The information given may be speculative.
Date is the date of:
 closest encounter (flybys)
 impact (impactors)
 orbital insertion to end of mission, whether planned or premature (orbiters)
 landing to end of mission, whether planned or premature (landers)
 launch (missions that never got underway due to failure at or soon after launch)
 In cases which do not fit any of the above, the event to which the date refers is stated. Note that as a result of this scheme missions are not always listed in order of launch.
 In the case of flybys (such as gravity assists) that are incidental to the main mission, "success" indicates the successful completion of the flyby, not necessarily that of the main mission.

Lunar probes by date

1958–1960

1962–1965

1966–1967

1968–1970

1971–1976

1983–1998

2001–2009

2010–2019

2020–present

Future

See also

Lists of spacecraft
List of landings on extraterrestrial bodies
List of missions to the Moon
List of Solar System probes
Robotic spacecraft
Timeline of Solar System exploration

Notes

Exploration of the Moon
Lunar probes